Keudell is a surname of:

 Elsbeth von Keudell (1857–1953), German nurse and senior coordinator of the Countess Rittberg Sisters' Association of the Red Cross
 Hans von Keudell (1892–1917), German World War I flying ace
 Marie von Keudell (1838–1918),  German painter known for her landscape painting
 Robert von Keudell (1824–1903), German diplomat, politician and music lover
 Walter von Keudell (1884–1973), German forest expert and politician

Surnames of German origin
German-language surnames